All Saints College is a dual-campus independent Roman Catholic co-educational secondary day school, located in the Hunter Valley region of New South Wales, Australia. The College is administered by the Catholic Schools Office of the Roman Catholic Diocese of Maitland-Newcastle.

The St Mary's campus caters for students in Year 11 and Year 12. The St Peter's campus caters for students in Year 7 to Year 10.

History
The forebears of All Saints College are St John's Boys School, a primary school established in 1838, St Mary’s Dominican Convent School, established in 1867, and the Marist Brothers High School, Maitland (later known as St Peter's High School).

In September 1990 Bishop Leo Clarke (the Bishop of the Diocese of Maitland Newcastle) announced that the three local single-sex Catholic high schools would become co-educational, and united under the banner of All Saints College. St Joseph's College, in the rural village of Lochinvar, and St Peter's were to be Years 7-10 and St Mary's, Years 11-12. The three schools began to operate in their current co-educational format in 1992.

Following a Study into the Provision of Catholic Education in the Diocese of Maitland-Newcastle, in 2018 St Joseph's College, Lochinvar terminated its membership of All Saints College and became a stand-alone Years 7-12 school. In 2016, it was announced that St Peter's Campus, Maitland principal Michael Blake had secured the position of principal at Champagnat College,  and concluded his role at St Peter's at the end of Term 2. All Saints College is going to convert the school to one campus being St Peters. St Mary’s will then be converted into a university.

Notable alumni

 Andrew Johns, rugby league player
 Mark Hughes (rugby league, born 1976), rugby league player

See also

 List of non-government schools in New South Wales
 Catholic education in Australia

References

External links
 St Mary's Campus Website
 St Peter's Campus Website
 Catholic Schools Office Maitland-Newcastle Website

Maitland, New South Wales
All Saints College, Maitland
1992 establishments in Australia